The Botswana national cricket team is the men's team that represents Botswana in international cricket. They have been an associate member of the International Cricket Council since 2005, after previously being an affiliate member since 2001 and an associate member in 2017. They are in Division Five of the World Cricket League and are ranked at joint 29th in the world by the International Cricket Council (ICC), the 5th-highest ranked non-test team in the African region. The team's coach is former Kenyan ODI player Joseph Angara, who was appointed in July 2015.

History
Cricket was started in the country by expatriates from South Africa and the Indian subcontinent. Botswana was elected to the ICC as an affiliate member in 2001, and played in the Africa Cup in Zambia the following year. After winning all their first-round matches against Namibia, Tanzania, Zambia and Zimbabwe, they beat Kenya in the semi-final before losing by 270 runs to South Africa in the final.

In March 2004, they won the African affiliates qualifying tournament for the 2005 ICC Trophy, qualifying them for the next stage of qualification, the Africa Cricket Association Championships. They beat Nigeria and Tanzania in that tournament in Zambia in August, finishing fourth, thus missing out on qualification for their first ICC Trophy. They were rewarded for their performance in this tournament by being promoted to associate membership of the ICC in 2005.

In 2006, they took part in Division Two of the African region of the World Cricket League, finishing second behind Tanzania. This qualified them for Division Five of the World Cricket League.

In May 2008, Botswana travelled to Jersey to take part in the Division Five tournament. Although Botswana beat the Bahamas in Group B, it was their only group stage win and with three losses and one match abandoned due to rain they failed to make the semi-finals. Botswana finished sixth overall after defeating Germany but losing to Singapore in positional playoff matches. With only the top two from this tournament qualifying for Division Four in Tanzania later in the year, Botswana missed out on the chance to take their 2011 World Cup dream any further.

In October 2008, Botswana took part in Division Two of the African region of the World Cricket League, finishing unbeaten and winning the tournament. This victory promoted them to Division One of the Africa Region, however the date and venue for this tournament is still to be determined.

In August 2009, Botswana travelled to Singapore to participate in Division Six of the World Cricket League. Despite being competitive in most of their games, Botswana won only one of five group matches and finished fifth after beating Norway in a positional playoff.

In May 2011, Botswana hosted the ICC World Cricket League Division Seven with a young squad and performed admirably well, winning three league stage matches against Norway, Japan and Germany but losing out to eventual champions Kuwait, 2nd placed Nigeria and finally Germany in the placing match. The match versus Nigeria in the league stages was to decide which of the 2 nations would progress to the ICC World Cricket League Division Six to be held in Malaysia in September 2011 and by losing that match, Botswana failed to progress and will remain in Division Seven till the next instalment of the ICC WCL.

In April 2013, Botswana were given hosting rights again for the ICC World Cricket League Division 7 in their second attempt in trying to get promoted out of Division 7 after halting the relegation slide in the last edition. Beating Ghana in the first match, Botswana lost their second match in a competitive encounter against Vanuatu by 23 runs. Botswana then lost third next match heavily to eventual WCL Div 7 winners and arch rivals Nigeria. Botswana tried in vain to get back into contention for promotion but after a tied match against Germany, all hopes were dashed and the best they could hope for was a third-place finish. This was achieved by beating Fiji in the last group match and then beating them again in the third-place playoff earning Botswana a third place, finishing behind Vanuatu and Nigeria who were both promoted to Division 6 of the WCL. With the ICC's decision to eliminate the ICC World Cricket League Divisions 7 and 8, Botswana will now have to qualify through regional tournaments to make it into the ICC World Cricket League Division 6, which will now be the entry point for the World Cricket League.

2018–present

In April 2018, the ICC decided to grant full Twenty20 International (T20I) status to all its members. Therefore, all Twenty20 matches played between Botswana and other ICC members since 1 January 2019 have been full T20Is. 

Botswana’s first T20I match was against Uganda on 20 May 2019, after finishing first in the Southern sub-region qualification group, advancing to the Regional Final of the 2018–19 ICC World Twenty20 Africa Qualifier tournament.

Grounds

 BCA Ground (Oval 1 & 2), Gaborone
 Lobatse Cricket Ground, Lobatse

Tournament history

World Cricket League Africa Region
 2006: Division Two runners-up
 2008: Division Two winners

World Cricket League
 2008: Division Five 6th place
 2009: Division Six 5th place
 2011: Division Seven 4th place
 2013: Division Seven 3rd place
 2015: Division Six 6th place

ACA Africa T20 Cup
2022: Semi-final

Records and Statistics 

International match summary
 
Last updated 25 November 2022

Twenty20 International 

 Highest team total: 185/6 v Mozambique, 19 September 2022 at Willowmoore Park, Benoni 
 Highest individual score: 100, Vinoo Balakrishnan v Saint Helena, 25 November 2022 at Gahanga International Cricket Stadium, Kigali  
 Best individual bowling figures: 5/18, Dhruv Maisuria v Ghana, 18 September 2022 at Willowmoore Park, Benoni  

Most T20I runs for Botswana

Most T20I wickets for Botswana

T20I record versus other nations

Records complete to T20I #1921. Last updated 25 November 2022.

Other records
For a list of selected international matches played by Botswana, see Cricket Archive.

Squad
Botswana's squad for the final round of the 2021 ICC Men's T20 World Cup Africa Qualifier Group B in November 2021.

 Karabo Motlhanka (c)
 Vinoo Balakrishnan
 Boemo Khumalo
 Dhruv Maisuria
 Rod Mbaiwa
 Valentine Mbazo
 Mmoloki Mooketsi
 James Moses
 Reginald Nehonde
 Tharindu Perera
 Katlo Piet
 Adithiya Rangaswamy
 Phemelo Silas
 Thatayaone Tshose

See also
 List of Botswana Twenty20 International cricketers
 Botswana women's national cricket team

References

National cricket teams
Cricket in Botswana
Cricket
Botswana in international cricket